The 2020 Los Angeles Wildcats season was the only season for the Los Angeles Wildcats as a professional American football franchise. They played as charter members of the XFL, one of eight teams to compete in the league for the 2020 season. The Wildcats played their home games at Dignity Health Sports Park and were led by head coach Winston Moss.

Their inaugural season was cut short due to the COVID-19 pandemic and the XFL officially suspended operations for the remainder of the season on March 20, 2020.

Offseason

XFL Draft

Tier 1 Quarterback Allocations

Phase 1: Skill Players

Phase 2: Offensive line

Phase 3: Defensive Front Seven

Phase 4: Defensive backs

Phase 5: Open Draft

Standings

Schedule
All times Pacific

Final roster

Staff

Game summaries

Week 1: at Houston Roughnecks

Week 2: vs. Dallas Renegades

Week 3: vs. DC Defenders

Week 4: at New York Guardians

Week 5: Tampa Bay Vipers

References

Los Angeles
2020 in sports in California
Los Angeles Wildcats